The Greater Sudbury Police Service is the police force for the municipality of Greater Sudbury, Ontario, Canada.

The police force has over 350 employees, including 264 police officers, and is divided into two main areas: operations and corporate services. The operations section includes the following divisions:  uniform, criminal investigations, uniform field support, emergency operations and organizational support.

Paul Pedersen was appointed police chief on March 25, 2014.

Services include drug enforcement, criminal investigations, domestic violence, youth liaison, traffic, special weapons And tactics, seniors' liaison, aboriginal liaison, forensics, victims' assistance, crime prevention, community response, K9.

History
Originally formed in 1891, the Sudbury Police became the Sudbury Regional Police on January 1, 1973  and was amalgamated in 2001 as the current Greater Sudbury Police Service.

References

External links
 Greater Sudbury Police Service

1891 establishments in Ontario
Law enforcement agencies of Ontario
Municipal government of Greater Sudbury